Schuss (German for 'shot') was the first (then unofficial) mascot of the 1968 Winter Olympics in Grenoble, France, featuring a stylized cartoon character wearing skis.  Schuss was seen on pins and small toys. Afterwards, every Olympic Games has had a mascot (excluding the 1972 Winter Olympics in Sapporo, Japan)

In alpine skiing, a schuss or schussboom is a straight downhill run at high speed, contrasting with a slalom, mogul, or ski jumping.

References

External links
HickokSports-Olympic Mascots
Olympic.org Mascots

Olympic mascots
1968 Winter Olympics
Fictional French people
French mascots
French culture